Kugesi (Kükeś) is an urban-type settlement in Cheboksarsky District, the Chuvash Republic, Russia. Population:

References

Notes

Sources

Urban-type settlements in Chuvashia